Hatak (YTB-219), a wooden tug, was originally designated YT-219 and built by Greenport Basin and Construction Company, Long Island, New York; launched 22 July 1944, Mrs. B. L. Lea as sponsor; and placed in service as YTB-219, 18 December 1944.

Service history

After fitting out at New York Navy Yard, Hatak proceeded to report to the 5th Naval District for duty in January 1945. She remained in the Norfolk area as a tugboat until struck from the Navy List 27 June 1957.

References 
 
 NavSource Online: Service Ship Photo Archive Hatak (YTB-219)

 

Tugs of the United States Navy
Ships built in Greenport, New York
1944 ships